Alphonsea philastreana is a tree species first described by Pierre, named by Finet and Gagnepain and included in the family Annonaceae.  No subspecies are listed in the Catalogue of Life.  Its Vietnamese name is an phong nhiều trái.

References

External links

philastreana
Flora of Vietnam